The 2003 V8 Supercar season was the 44th year of touring car racing in Australia since the first runnings of the Australian Touring Car Championship and the fore-runner of the present day Bathurst 1000, the Armstrong 500.

There were 21 touring car race meetings held during 2003; a thirteen-round series for V8 Supercars, the 2003 V8 Supercar Championship Series (VCS), two of them endurance races; a six-round second tier V8 Supercar series 2003 Konica V8 Supercar Series (KVS) along with a non-point scoring race supporting the Bathurst 1000 and V8 Supercar support programme event at the 2003 Australian Grand Prix.

Season review
The 2003 season brought substantial change at the pointy end of the series, with the era of the Holden Racing Teams dominance of V8 Supercar ending and the era of Stone Brothers Racing beginning. Marcos Ambrose form throughout the series was irresistible. From the series third round at Eastern Creek Raceway to the eighth round at Oran Park Raceway SBR Falcons took all six wins, Ambrose five of them with a second place behind Ingall at Queensland Raceway the only aberration. Ingall would win again in the Gold Coast street race with Ambrose confirming his championship at the Eastern Creek championship finale. Holden did not give in willingly, Mark Skaife and Greg Murphy each winning two rounds, with Skaife and Todd Kelly taking the reborn Sandown 500 as one of them, while one of Murphy's wins was Bathurst with his co-driver Rick Kelly becoming the youngest Bathurst winner. The only other round winner was Craig Lowndes had his first win for new team Ford Performance Racing.

Apart from the enduros, Stone Brothers Racing swept all before them with Mark Winterbottom dominating the Konica V8 Supercar Series in SBR's older AU Falcon. Winterbottom won four of the six rounds, the others were won by Andrew Jones and eventual series runner up Matthew White.

Results and standings

Race calendar
The 2003 Australian touring car season consisted of 20 events.

Netspace V8Supercar Showdown 
This meeting was a support event of the 2003 Australian Grand Prix.

V8 Supercar Championship Series

Konica V8 Supercar Series

Konica V8 Supercar Challenge Race 
This race was a support event of the 2003 Bob Jane T-Marts 1000.

References

Additional references can be found in linked event/series reports.

External links
 Official V8 Supercar site
 2003 Racing Results Archive 

 
Supercar seasons